The Vallard Atlas is a world atlas, one of the Dieppe school of maps, produced in 1547. It is believed to have been owned by Nicolas Vallard, its authorship being unknown.

History 
It is considered one of the most notable 16th century atlases of the Dieppe school of Cartography. It is believed that Nicholas Vallard was the first owner and this is why the publication bears his name 

The atlas is held at the Huntington Library based in San Marino, California, US.

Description 
The atlas is made of 68 pages and contains 15 nautical charts with rich illustrations as well as a calendar and some in-depth maritime information. 
The atlas contains numerous illuminations that show the new world inhabitants and this is why it is considered a valuable testimony of discovery. The original publication is bound in crimson leather with golden decorations.

The maps depicted in the atlas are inverted compared to modern depictions, as the north pole is placed on the bottom side of the atlas while the south pole is placed on the top.

There is some speculation that like some other works of the Dieppe school of maps, the atlas shows the Australian coastline, a continent entitled Jave la Grande, which would mean it was painted before the documented arrival of Willem Janszoon or James Cook. However, most historians do not accept this theory, and the interpretation of this feature of the Vallard and other Dieppe maps is highly contentious.

References

External links
 Image published by El Mundo newspaper on 15 October 2015 
 Unique copy edition published in 2010 by M.Moleiro publishing house 

 atlases
1547 books
French travel books